Decal is an American film distribution company owned by Neon and Bleecker Street. It was launched in February 2021.

History
The distribution companies Bleecker Street and Neon had signed multi-year deals with Universal Pictures Home Entertainment for the home media releases of their films. When these deals came close to expiring, Bleecker Street and Neon collaborated to launch Decal in February 2021. The company's purpose is to distribute and handle the home entertainment releases for their films as well as the films from Greenwich Entertainment. Decal also has the ability to purchase third-party content for distribution. It is overseen by Neon's Andrew Brown and Bleecker Street's Kent Sanderson. Decal's team includes Sara Castillo as Senior Vice President (SVP) of Marketing and Distribution, Ayo Kepher-Maat as SVP of Acquisitions, who works alongside Catillo to oversee day-to-day operations, and Lilly Stuecklen as Distribution Manager.

In March 2021, the company acquired the North American rights to Gaia, a South African horror-thriller. In May 2021, Decal acquired Ride the Eagle, a comedy film starring Jake Johnson, D'Arcy Carden, J. K. Simmons, and Susan Sarandon; it was released the following month in 15 theaters and through on-demand. In July, Decal purchased the rights to Recovery, a comedy from former Studio C cast members Mallory Everton, Stephen Meek, and Whitney Call. The film was retitled Stop and Go and released on October 1, 2021, in select theaters and straight-to-video. On October 18, Decal acquired the rights to The Last Victim, a thriller starring Ron Perlman, Ali Larter, and Ralph Ineson. On October 26, Decal signed a multi-year deal to handle the home entertainment releases of all titles released by XYZ Films.

In May 2022, the company acquired the rights to I'm Totally Fine and Abyzou from that year's Marché du Film.

Filmography

2020s

Upcoming

References

External links
 

Film distributors of the United States
Mass media companies established in 2021